Argyrella is a genus of flowering plants belonging to the family Melastomataceae.

Its native range is Africa.

Species:

Argyrella amplexicaulis 
Argyrella angolensis 
Argyrella bambutorum 
Argyrella canescens 
Argyrella linearis 
Argyrella phaeotricha 
Argyrella richardsiae 
Argyrella sessilis

References

Melastomataceae
Melastomataceae genera